Mihail Krassilov (born 5 March 1990) is a Kazakhstani long distance runner who specialises in the marathon. He competed in the marathon event at the 2015 World Championships in Athletics in Beijing, China.

In 2010, he competed in the men's half marathon at the 2010 IAAF World Half Marathon Championships held in Nanning, China. He finished in 66th place. In 2017, he represented Kazakhstan at the 2017 Summer Universiade, held in Taipei, Taiwan, in the men's half marathon event. He did not finish his race.

References

External links

1990 births
Living people
Place of birth missing (living people)
Kazakhstani male long-distance runners
Kazakhstani male marathon runners
World Athletics Championships athletes for Kazakhstan
Competitors at the 2017 Summer Universiade
Athletes (track and field) at the 2018 Asian Games
Asian Games competitors for Kazakhstan
21st-century Kazakhstani people